Serse Cosmi (born 5 May 1958) is an Italian football coach, most recently in charge of Rijeka.

Career

Early career
Cosmi was born in 1958 in Ponte San Giovanni, a Perugia frazione. His father, a cycling fan, called him Serse after Fausto Coppi's brother, a cyclist himself, who died following a fall during a sprint. He worked nine years as primary school teacher, and played amateur football during his freetime for local teams such as Deruta, Cannara, Spello and Pontevecchio, in the role of midfielder.

He started a coaching career in the late 1980s in Ellera, as under-18 youth team coach. His debut as first team coach came in 1990, when he was appointed to coach Pontevecchio, a small amateur team from his native town of Ponte San Giovanni. Cosmi brought it on from the Prima Categoria (fourth level of amateur leagues in Italy) to Serie D (the top one) in just five years. Successively, he joined Arezzo, which he led from Serie D to Serie C1 in five extremely positive years.

Perugia
After being noted by Luciano Gaucci, in 2000 Cosmi was surprisingly appointed head coach of Perugia, in the Serie A. He guided the team for four consecutive years, winning a UEFA Intertoto Cup, showing valid coaching abilities and launching several players, including 2006 FIFA World Cup winner Marco Materazzi (who reached a career high of 12 goals in a single season under Cosmi's tenure), then-unknown Japanese Hidetoshi Nakata, Fabrizio Miccoli, Fabio Grosso and Fabio Liverani. Cosmi's period at Perugia would last four years, during which he led the fringe Umbrian club to victory in the 2003 UEFA Intertoto Cup.

Genoa and Udinese
In 2004 Cosmi left Perugia, after the team went relegated at the end of the season, and joined Genoa of Serie B, with the clear goal to bring the rossoblu back to Serie A.

At the end of the 2004–05 season, Cosmi managed to win the league and guide his team to Serie A, but he successively left because of discords with club chairman Enrico Preziosi, before the relegation of Genoa itself to Serie C1 because of match frauds.

After his short, but successful, experience with Genoa, Cosmi was signed as new coach of Udinese, in order to replace Luciano Spalletti, who gained the qualification to the preliminary rounds of Champions' League the previous season. But it was Cosmi who led the team on the European competition, defeating Sporting Clube de Portugal in a two-tier qualifying round.

However, after a disappointing series of results, including elimination in Champions League and results in Serie A much below the expected results, Cosmi was finally fired on 10 February 2006.

Brescia and Livorno
On 28 February 2007, he was appointed head coach of Serie B club Brescia. On his very first match after replacing Mario Somma, Cosmi led Brescia to an astonishing 3–1 result against Serie B leaders Juventus. He was fired on September 2008 due to poor result to make room for new boss Nedo Sonetti.

On 20 October 2009, Cosmi made a Serie A comeback as new head coach of bottom-placed relegation battlers Livorno. In his first game in charge, he guided Livorno to a surprising 1–0 away win against AS Roma, which was immediately followed by a second consecutive 1–0 win, against Atalanta, only three days later.

Despite fairly good results at the helm of Livorno, Cosmi resigned from his coaching post on 24 January 2010, in the wake of a 2–0 home loss to fourth-placed Napoli due to disagreements with club chairman Aldo Spinelli. Two days later, on 26 January, Cosmi and Spinelli met each other in attempt to clarify each other, also following the supporter fanbase's criticism of the way Spinelli handled the issue. Following the meeting, both parties agreed that the head coach's resignation offer would have been rejected and Cosmi would return at Livorno with immediate effect. This however lasted only a few more weeks, and Cosmi was dismissed later on April following a string of negative results that left Livorno down at the bottom of the table.

Palermo
After more than a year without a job, Cosmi returned into management on 28 February 2011, taking over coaching duties at Palermo as a replacement for Delio Rossi, who was dismissed from the Sicilian club following a record 0–7 home defeat to Udinese. At Palermo, Cosmi reunited with former players Fabrizio Miccoli and Fabio Liverani, as well as ex-player and team staff member Giovanni Tedesco.

After three losses and one victory against A.C. Milan, Serse Cosmi was released by club president Zamparini after a disappointing 4–0 loss to Catania.

Lecce
On 4 December 2011, Cosmi was unveiled as new head coach of bottom-placed Serie A side Lecce, replacing Eusebio Di Francesco.

Later career
On 27 June 2012, Cosmi was appointed the new coach of Siena in Serie A on a two-year contract, but on 17 December he was sacked.

On 24 February 2014, Cosmi returned into management as new head coach of Serie B club Pescara, replacing Pasquale Marino but failing to turn the team fortunes and missing out qualification for the promotion playoffs. He left the club by the end of the season.

On 11 March 2015, he was named manager of Serie B side Trapani replacing long-serving Roberto Boscaglia.  Cosmi led Trapani to the 2016 Serie B promotion playoffs, where they were defeated by Pescara in the final round.  He was sacked by Trapani on 28 November 2016, after obtaining only 11 points from the first 16 rounds of the season and having his car set on fire by the club's supporters.

On 7 December 2017, Cosmi was named as the replacement for Fulvio Fiorin at Serie B side, Ascoli. He was replaced by Vincenzo Vivarini on 12 July 2018.

On 6 March 2019, Cosmi was appointed as manager of Venezia FC.

On 4 January 2020, Cosmi returned to Perugia after 16 years, substituting Massimo Oddo. He signed a contract until 30 June.

Cosmi was appointed as manager of Crotone on 1 March 2021, following the sacking of Giovanni Stroppa, signing a contract until the end of the season. After failing to save his team from relegation to Serie B, with Crotone ending in 19th place in the league, the club announced they would not confirm Cosmi for the following season.

On 4 September 2022, Cosmi returned into management as the new head coach of Croatian club Rijeka. His experience at the club however proved to be short-lived, as he was dismissed on 13 November 2022 following a 2–7 loss to GNK Dinamo Zagreb.

Style
Cosmi is widely popular in Italy for his excitable behaviour during matches. He is also famous for always wearing a baseball cap (usually that of his team, but often with just his signature printed on it).

Managerial statistics

Honours

Managerial
Perugia (2000–2004)
UEFA Intertoto Cup: 2003

See also
List of UEFA Intertoto Cup winning managers

References

1958 births
Living people
Sportspeople from Perugia
Association football defenders
Italian footballers
Italian football managers
A.C. Perugia Calcio managers
Genoa C.F.C. managers
Udinese Calcio managers
S.S. Arezzo managers
Brescia Calcio managers
U.S. Livorno 1915 managers
Palermo F.C. managers
U.S. Lecce managers
A.C.N. Siena 1904 managers
Delfino Pescara 1936 managers
Ascoli Calcio 1898 F.C. managers
Venezia F.C. managers
F.C. Crotone managers
HNK Rijeka managers
Serie A managers
Serie B managers
Croatian Football League managers